Humoresque is a 1946 American melodrama film by Warner Bros. starring Joan Crawford and John Garfield in an older woman/younger man tale about a violinist and his patroness.  The screenplay by Clifford Odets and Zachary Gold was based upon the 1919 short story "Humoresque" by Fannie Hurst, which previously was made into a film in 1920. Humoresque was directed by Jean Negulesco and produced by Jerry Wald.

Plot

In New York City, a performance by noted violinist Paul Boray is cancelled. Something has happened which has brought Boray to rock bottom emotionally. At his apartment, he seems to be about to give up on his career; his manager Frederic Bauer is angry that Paul has misunderstood what performing would be like and admonishes him for thinking that music could no longer be part of his life. Paul's more sympathetic friend and accompanist Sid Jeffers asks Bauer to leave, and Boray says to Jeffers that he (Boray) always has wanted to do the right thing, but always has been "on the outside, looking in," and cannot "get back to that happy kid" he once was.

In the past, young Paul is choosing a birthday present in a variety store run by Jeffers’ father in their neighborhood in New York City. He rejects the suggestions of his father, a grocery store owner, but settles on a violin, which his father rejects as unsuitable; his price limit is $1.50. Esther, his mother, supportive at this stage, buys the $8 violin for the boy.

A transition from his faltering first steps to being a gifted young violinist follows. On 15 October 1930, he overhears his family expressing frustration about the state of their finances and about how he is not helping by working at a real job. His father is dismissive of Paul's chances for success, and his brother Phil is extremely negative concerning his own possibilities for finding any job at all. Paul resolves to go out on his own so he is not dependent on his family or appears to be taking advantage of them. He finds a job with a locally broadcast orchestra in which Sid Jeffers is the pianist.

At a party, Paul meets the hostess, Helen Wright, a patroness in a loveless marriage with an ineffectual, aging third husband. Helen is a self-centered, adulterous woman who uses men as sexual playthings and is initially baffled by the strong-willed and independent Boray. She is rude to him during the party, but the next day, she sends him a gold cigarette case and a note of apology. "Papa" Boray is impressed, but Paul's mother is suspicious.

At first, Helen seems interested only in Boray's talent rather than in him as a person, though he is quick to press her on the second issue. He gains a manager, Bauer, from her connections, and is now in love with her. On the beach, near the Wrights' Long Island home, he reaches out to Helen after a swim, but she runs away; later in the evening, she falls off a horse, and as he tries to aid her, she resists, not wanting to be touched. He kisses her, and she tells him to leave her alone, although she clearly is drawn to him and makes no effort to run away.

Shortly, everything is different. As they lie by the ocean, Helen warns him he might be sorry that love was invented, but admits she cannot fight him any longer, and she admits she is in love with him. Waiting at home, his mother confronts him, pointing out that he has missed a date with Gina, also a musician and his long-time sweetheart. Esther does not believe Paul's denials that he has any interest in Helen. She warns him to be careful and to think carefully about his future. After Paul's debut concert, Esther heard Victor's putdown of Paul as a "savage".

After a tour across America that takes several months, he has lunch with Gina. Sid arrives with Helen, who is immediately jealous and flees. Paul follows her, and they end up at Teddy's Bar. After Helen makes a scene by smashing her drink ("What Is This Thing Called Love?" is performed by Peg LaCentra in the background), against a wall, she and Paul go back to her home where she expresses anger at being neglected and begs him to allow her to be more involved in his life. Paul points out her married status, but Helen shrugs this off, suggesting they are both old enough to do as they choose. He kisses her.

At his new apartment containing numerous photographs of Helen, he confesses his love for her to his mother. They argue, and his mother slaps him. Disquieted by rumors he has heard, Helen's husband Victor asks her for a divorce. He is suspicious of her real intentions, asking her if she really can change and be happy with Paul, but Helen insists this is first time she has known real love.

At a rehearsal, Paul is passed a note from Helen claiming good news. She asks to see him immediately, but he crumples the note and continues with the rehearsal of the Carmen Fantasie (adapted for the film by Franz Waxman from Bizet's Carmen). At Teddy's Bar, Helen becomes increasingly drunk, and she is unable to tolerate the house pianist's performing "Embraceable You". Paul arrives to take her home. He repeatedly tells her he wants to marry her but she tries to dissuade him, even as she declares how much she loves him.

She goes to visit Paul's mother and attempts to convey that she understands herself, what sort of woman she is, but that she genuinely loves him. Esther does not bend; she does not believe Helen has any good intentions and demands she leave Paul alone.

Neither Helen nor Esther attend Boray's next concert, his transcription of Wagner's Liebestod. Helen listens on the radio, after talking with him on the telephone and telling him not to worry. She drinks, becomes more upset with herself, and recalling her husband's words, realizes her dissolute past can only taint Paul's future. She walks along the beach and then to her death in the nearby ocean; in her jaded mind, this is the only logical resolution to their problems. Later, on the beach, a distraught Paul is comforted by the loyal Jeffers.

Returning to the film's opening scene, Paul asks Jeffers to tell Bauer not to worry; he is not running away. The closing scene shows Paul walking on the street toward his family's grocery store.

Cast

Production

The movie is the second adaptation of the novel, the first being a 1920 silent version directed by Frank Borzage. It was Crawford's first film after her Oscar-winning role in Mildred Pierce, and her third for Warner Bros., after being bought out by MGM (who paid Crawford $100,000 when the contract was terminated by mutual consent). Costumes for Humoresque were designed by Adrian and Bernard Newman.

During an August 15, 1973 appearance on The Tonight Show, Robert Blake stated he had been unable to generate tears during one of his scenes. John Garfield cleared the set and began to tell him about his own childhood, his mother's death and growing up on the streets in the Bronx. It had the desired effect on the young Blake, and he was able to complete the scene.

Music
Franz Waxman orchestrated and conducted the score. Violinist Isaac Stern served as musical advisor, and the film includes close-ups of Stern's hands playing the violin, ostensibly the hands of Garfield. Stern (not Garfield) was the actual solo violinist on the movie's soundtrack. Oscar Levant, who played Sid Jeffers, was a celebrated pianist, and it is Levant's piano playing that is on the soundtrack. Eric DeLamarter, former associate conductor and organist of the Chicago Symphony Orchestra, appears in the film as the orchestra conductor.

Parts of these classical music pieces are heard in the film:

 Antonín Dvořák: Humoresque Op. 101 No. 7, in G-flat major
 Rimsky-Korsakov: Flight of the Bumblebee
 Richard Wagner: Tristan und Isolde and especially its final Liebestod
 Édouard Lalo: Symphonie espagnole
 Tchaikovsky: Romeo and Juliet
 Tchaikovsky: Piano Concerto No. 1
 Tchaikovsky: Violin Concerto
 Brahms: Violin Concerto
 Brahms: Waltz in A-flat major, Op. 39 No. 15
 Bizet: Carmen suite
 Sarasate: Zigeunerweisen (Gypsy Airs)
 Mendelssohn: Violin Concerto
 Wieniawski: Violin Concerto No. 2
 César Franck: Violin Sonata
 Edvard Grieg: Piano Concerto
 Sergei Prokofiev: Piano Concerto No. 3
 Dmitri Shostakovich: Polka
 Bach: Sonata in G minor

Songs in the film:

 George Gershwin (music) and Ira Gershwin (lyrics): "Embraceable You"
 Cole Porter: "You Do Something to Me"
 Cole Porter: "What Is This Thing Called Love?"

Columbia Masterworks released an album of music from this movie consisting of four 78-rpm phonograph records (Columbia Masterworks set MM-657, copyright 1946).

In 1998, Nonesuch Records released an album of music from this movie, recorded in 1997 in London and New York, featuring violinist Nadja Salerno-Sonnenberg.

Critical reception
Lawrence J. Quirk commented "Humoresque is undoubtedly Crawford's finest performance...Her timing was flawless, her appearance lovely, her emotions depthful."

Bosley Crowther in The New York Times of December 26, 1946 observed "[T]here is certainly nothing humorous about the lachrymose Humoresque . . . . It is rather a mawkish lamentation upon the hopelessness of love between an art-dedicated violinist and a high-toned lady who lives for self alone. . . . [T]he Warner Brothers have wrapped this piteous affair in a blanket of soul-tearing music which is supposed to make it spiritually purgative. . . . The music, we must say, is splendid—and, if you will only shut your eyes so that you don't have to watch Mr. Garfield leaning his soulful face against that violin or Miss Crawford violently emoting, . . . you may enjoy it very much."
Robert Osborne of Turner Classic Movies explains: Garfield did not actually play the violin in the closeup scenes...the hands were actually the hands of an unknown professional violinist. Very convincing.

Awards and honors
Franz Waxman received an Academy Award nomination for Best Music, Scoring of a Dramatic or Comedy Picture.

The film was nominated for the American Film Institute's 2002 list AFI's 100 Years ... 100 Passions.

Box office
The film's budget was estimated to be around $2,164,000. The film fared well at the box office and grossed $3,399,000, and the film was hailed a success. With inflation in 2007, the gross is $35,737,750.

According to Warner Bros., the film earned $2,281,000 domestically and $1,118,000 in foreign markets.

According to Variety the film earned $2.6 million in rentals in 1947.

In popular culture
Humoresque was parodied on the television show SCTV in 1981. The Joan Crawford role was played by Catherine O'Hara as Crawford, and the John Garfield role was played by violin virtuoso Eugene Fodor.

In 1998, pop star Madonna released a video for her single "The Power of Good-Bye", based on several scenes from the movie.

Notes

External links
 
 
 
 
 

1946 films
1946 romantic drama films
American black-and-white films
American romantic drama films
Films about classical music and musicians
Films about violins and violinists
Films based on short fiction
Films based on works by Fannie Hurst
Films directed by Jean Negulesco
Films scored by Franz Waxman
Films set in New York City
Warner Bros. films
1940s English-language films
1940s American films